The Beaufort Sea (Iñupiaq: Taġiuq) is a marginal sea of the Arctic Ocean, located north of the Northwest Territories, the Yukon, and Alaska, and west of Canada's Arctic islands. The sea is named after Sir Francis Beaufort, a hydrographer. The Mackenzie River, the longest in Canada, empties into the Canadian part of the Beaufort Sea west of Tuktoyaktuk, which is one of the few permanent settlements on the sea's shores.

The sea, characterized by severe climate, is frozen over most of the year. Historically, only a narrow pass up to  opened in August–September near its shores, but recently due to climate change in the Arctic the ice-free area in late summer has greatly enlarged. Until recently, the Beaufort Sea was known as an important reservoir for the replenishment of Arctic sea ice. Sea ice would often rotate for several years in the Beaufort Gyre, the dominant ocean current of the Beaufort Sea, growing into sturdy and thick multi-year ice.

Claims that the seacoast was populated about 30,000 years ago have been largely discredited (see below); present population density is very low. The sea contains significant resources of petroleum and natural gas under its shelf, such as the Amauligak field. They were discovered in the period between the 1950s and 1980s, and since the latter part of that period their exploration has become the major human activity in the area. The traditional occupations of fishery and whale and seal hunting are practiced only locally, and have no commercial significance. As a result, the sea hosts one of the largest colonies of beluga whales, and there is no sign of overfishing. To prevent overfishing in its waters, the US adopted precautionary commercial fisheries management plan in August 2009. In April 2011 the Canadian government signed a memorandum of understanding with the Inuvialuit as a first step in developing a larger ocean management plan. The Canadian government announced in October 2014 that no new commercial fisheries in the Beaufort Sea will be considered until research has shown sustainable stocks that would be made available to Inuvialuit first.

The Canadian government designated blocks of the Beaufort Sea as Marine Protected Areas (MPAs). The Anguniaqvia niqiqyuam MPA surrounds the Parry Peninsula in the Amundsen Gulf, and the Tarium Niryutait MPA is located at the Mackenzie River delta and estuary. The protected areas are set to protect species and habitats for the Inuvialuit community.

Extent
The International Hydrographic Organization defines the limits of the Beaufort Sea as follows:
On the North. A line from Point Barrow, Alaska, to Lands End, Prince Patrick Island.

On the East. From Lands End through the Southwest coast of Prince Patrick Island to Griffiths Point, thence a line to Cape Prince Alfred, the Northwestern extreme of Banks Island, through its West coast to Cape Kellet, the Southwestern point, and thence a line to Cape Bathurst on the mainland.

Border dispute

There is an unresolved dispute involving a wedge-shaped slice on the International Boundary in the Beaufort Sea, between the Canadian territory of Yukon and the U.S. state of Alaska. This difference creates a wedge with an area of about  that is claimed by both nations.

Canada's position has its roots in the Treaty of Saint Petersburg (1825) between the United Kingdom and the Russian Empire that set the boundary between the two. Canada is the successor state to Great Britain in relation to this treaty, which stipulates:

Canada maintains that this treaty is extensible from the land into the Beaufort Sea along the meridian. The United States rejects this extension and instead asserts a boundary line based upon equidistance, although its position is somewhat undermined by its acceptance in 1867 of similar treaty wording and a similar interpretation under the treaty whereby it acquired Alaska. Both the U.S. and Canada agree that they are bound by the 1958 Convention on the Continental Shelf; and they both agree that the boundary should be "equitable", as determined by the International Court of Justice. They differ on what should be deemed "equitable". The U.S. contends that "equidistance is an appropriate principle for determining a maritime boundary where there are no special circumstances in the area and when equidistance results in a boundary in accordance with equitable principles". Canada contends that an equidistance principle does not result in an equitable boundary, because distortion would occur. The coast of Yukon is concave, whereas the coast of Alaska is convex; and thus an equidistance principle would result in a significant extension of the U.S. possession. Because of this, Canada argues that "special circumstances" apply to this border, a position that the U.S. rejects. This dispute is in this respect a mirror image of the dispute between the U.S. and Canada over the Gulf of Maine, where the U.S. argued for "special circumstances" and Canada argued for the equidistance principle. (In that latter dispute, both of those arguments were rejected, and the border was drawn based upon geometric principles taking into account geographic factors.) Neither the U.S. nor Canada has pressed for a swift resolution for the matter, or arbitration at the International Court of Justice, however; and the two have in the meantime cooperated in several measures aimed at preserving the maritime environment.

Before the end of 2004, the US leased eight plots of land below the water for oil exploration and exploitation, provoking a diplomatic protest from Canada. On 20 August 2009, United States Secretary of Commerce Gary Locke announced a moratorium on commercial fishing of the Beaufort Sea north of Alaska, including the disputed waters. In July 2010, US–Canada negotiations have started in Ottawa with the next meeting planned in 2011. A joint geological survey of the area has been initiated, and the issue was marked as settled by the CIA World Factbook, though no official document has been released by September 2010.

Moratorium on commercial fishing
On August 20, 2009 United States Secretary of Commerce Gary Locke announced a moratorium on fishing the Beaufort Sea north of Alaska. According to Locke: 

There is no widespread commercial fisheries in those waters now.

The moratorium was imposed in anticipation that global warming would make those waters accessible to commercial fisheries.
The moratorium stirred controversy in Canada because the region where the USA announced the moratorium included a large wedge-shaped region of disputed waters. Randy Boswell, of Canada.com wrote that the disputed area covered a  section of the Beaufort Sea.
He wrote that Canada had filed a "diplomatic note" with the US in April when the USA first announced plans for the moratorium.  Jack Layton, leader of the New Democratic Party of Canada, called the U.S. moratorium over the disputed waters in the Beaufort Sea the "largest encroachment on Canadian territory in our history."

Geography

Several rivers such as the Kongakut River in Alaska and the Firth River in Yukon empty into the Beaufort. The major river to flow into the sea is the Mackenzie, Canada's longest, which empties into the Canadian part of the sea, west of Tuktoyaktuk. The coastal shelf area is rather narrow, especially near and east of Point Barrow in the Alaskan part of the sea, and contains numerous submarine valleys. It becomes wider near the delta of the Mackenzie River but nowhere exceeds . Near the coast, the depths are shallower than  but they rapidly increase northwards up to a few kilometers, transforming into a massive platform which is geologically similar to that of the oceans. There are many small islands in the sea and in the delta of the Mackenzie River. A few larger ones lie west of the Mackenzie River, such as Herschel Island ( off the shore, area ) and Barter Island ( from the coast, area ). Consequently, buildings have to be elevated above ground on wooden piles that are immersed into the permafrost.

Hydrology and climate

During the 2000s, due to climate change in the Arctic, the ice-free area in late summer greatly enlarged. During the record minimum extent of Arctic sea ice in September, 2012, the sea ice boundary had retreated northward much farther than normal from the coast.

The channels of the Mackenzie River thaw earlier, in late May–early June.

Hidden changes in the ice cover of the Beaufort Sea were discovered in 2009. Whereas the ice area remain stable, as detected by the observation satellites, so as the associated water temperature and salinity, the ice structure has changed recently. The new ice, called rotten ice, is thinner and much weaker structurally.

The sea water has a stable temperature and is separated into four distinct layers as follows. The next layer is formed by the inflows from the Pacific Ocean and Bering Sea coming through the Bering Strait; it extends up to the North Pole. The warmest, deep Atlantic layer has the temperatures between 0 and 1 °C (32 to 34 °F), and water at the bottom is a bit colder at −0.4 to −0.8 °C (31.3 to 30.6 °F). The average salinity varies between 28‰ and 32‰ (parts per thousand) from south to north.

The water currents form the clockwise-directed Beaufort Gyre, that results in south-westerly and westerly currents near the shores. The Mackenzie River partly affects this circulation inducing minor eastwards streams near its mouth. The river annually brings about 15 million tonnes of sediments which are rich in dolomite and calcium carbonate. Those deposits are spread over the sea and mixed with mud and gravel.

Flora and fauna
The shoreline of the Beaufort Sea is covered with tundra and marks the northern limit of the terrestrial range of the polar bear in North America. The Mackenzie River is an important habitat for whales and seabirds and is still relatively untouched by commercial traffic. The delta of Mackenzie River contains numerous lakes and ponds which are inhabited by muskrat.

The sea hosts about 80 species of zooplankton, more than 70 species of phytoplankton, and nearly 700 species of polychaetes, bryozoans, crustaceans and mollusks, but their total volume is relatively small owing to the cold climate. Major fish species include polar cod (Boreogadus saida), Arctic cod (Arctogadus glacialis), saffron cod (Eleginus gracilis), Arctic char (Salvelinus alpinus), chum salmon (Oncorhynchus keta), Arctic cisco (Coregonus autumnalis), least cisco (Coregonus sardinella), lake whitefish (Coregonus clupeaformis), broad whitefish (Coregonus nasus), Pacific herring (Clupea pallasii), fourhorn sculpin (Myoxocephalus quadricornis), inconnu (Stenodus leucichthys) and flatfish.

The eastern part of the sea is a major habitat of beluga whales with an estimated population of 39,000. This population is stable and might even be increasing; it is not affected by the offshore oil exploration in the area. Belugas spend summer in the coastal area and Mackenzie River delta, which are free of ice then, and in winter migrate long distances to the polynyas of the deep sea. Genetic analyses have confirmed that belugas of the Beaufort Sea are clearly distinct from those of other Canadian and Alaskan waters, despite often sharing a common wintering habitat.

The food chain of the Beaufort Sea is relatively simple: It starts with phytoplankton and epontic algae (single-cell algae associated with the lower interface of sea ice), which provide energy to zooplankton, and epontic and coastal amphipods. The latter serve as a food for seabirds and fish, primarily as polar cod and Arctic char. Polar cod is a major food of Arctic char, beluga, narwhal, seabirds and seals, which are dominated by the bearded seal (Erignatus barbatus) and ringed seal (Pusa hispida). Bearded seal and walrus also feed on benthic invertebrates. On top of the food pyramid stands the polar bear, which feeds primarily on seals, but also on any large marine mammals when it has a chance, such as carcasses and whales trapped in ice fields.

Human activities

"There is only one proposed Early-Entry site in eastern Beringia that still has proponents, Bluefish Caves in the Porcupine River Basin, Yukon Territory, Canada. Claims of great antiquity in the area [e.g., 30kya] have a convoluted history. A caribou tibia flesher, the most diagnostic human implement from the Old Crow basin, had been dated at near 28 kya. When redated using accelerator mass spectrometry (AMS) of small amounts of remnant collagen the bone produced a 1.8 kya date (Yesner 1996b:255)". There is no evidence for anomalous occupation of Beaufort coasts in the context of Arctic cultures generally, including the arrival about 4,000 years ago by Paleo-Eskimos such as the Dorset culture, around 1,000 years ago by the Thule and finally by the modern Inuit. From early ages, they practiced fishing – bones of Arctic char were found at the 4,000 years old settlements. While originally they lived nomadic life, later, they started to form permanent settlements. Their population is increasing, but the unemployment rate is relatively high.

Bowhead whales were hunted in the sea between 1888 and 1914. This practice stopped, first because of the decline in whale population and then because of government regulations, but resumed in the 1990s.

The major settlements along the Beaufort Sea are Tuktoyaktuk (population 930 in 2009) in Canada and Prudhoe Bay, Alaska. Although Prudhoe Bay is permanently populated by only a few people, there are thousands of contract workers in the area employed on petroleum production at the Prudhoe Bay Oil Field, which is on the coastal lowland known as the North Slope. Artificial islands, such as Endicott and Northstar, have been raised near the shores in 1987 and 2001, respectively. The crude oil is transported through the Trans-Alaska Pipeline System to the southern port of Valdez.

Fishing and sea hunting are practised by the local inhabitants and have no commercial value, especially after a US moratorium on commercial fishing of the Beaufort Sea, adopted in 2009. Trapping of muskrat at the Mackenzie River delta was the main source of income for the Athabaskan First Nations peoples and Inuit during 1920–1960, but has since declined.

Oil and gas exploration
The Beaufort Sea contains major gas and petroleum reserves beneath the seabed, a continuation of proven reserves in the nearby Mackenzie River and North Slope. Offshore drilling began in 1972; about 70 wells were set up by the 1980s and 200 wells by 2000. These activities resulted in dredging of about 46.5 million m3 of sea bottom soil, as well as discharge of drilling muds which contained barite, clay, caustic soda, and heavy metals zinc, copper, lead, chromium, cobalt, nickel, cadmium and mercury. About  of oil was produced in 1986.

A major gas field, named Taglu Gas Field, was discovered in the Mackenzie River delta in 1971, followed by the Parson Lake field and Niglintgak field. Moreover, further into the sea from the Mackenzie delta lies the Amauligak field. The development of these fields is hindered by their remote location. This problem was alleviated for Prudhoe Bay by constructing the Trans-Alaska Pipeline, but is limiting regular commercial production at Mackenzie River deposits. For example, the Amauligak Project was started soon after the discovery of the field. In September 1985, the tanker Gulf Beaufort has transported  of crude oil to Japan, which was the first shipment of oil from the Arctic deposits. However, the project has stalled after that.

In July 2017, the U.S. Bureau of Ocean Energy Management approved a plan to allow Eni, an Italian multinational oil and gas company, to drill four oil exploration wells on Spy Island, one of four artificial islands in the Beaufort Sea.

In popular culture
Stan Rogers references the Beaufort Sea in his popular Canadian Folk Song "Northwest Passage".

See also
 Arctic policy of the United States
 Canadian Internal Waters
 List of areas disputed by Canada and the United States
 List of seas
 Northwest Passage
 Petroleum exploration in the Arctic

References

Bibliography
 L. S. Parsons, William Henry Lear, National Research Council of Canada Perspectives on Canadian marine fisheries management, NRC Research Press, 1993

Further reading

External links
 Sea Ice in the Beaufort Sea  from NASA Earth Observatory
 CAC (Civil Applications Committee)/USGS Global Fiducials Program web page containing scientific description and interactive map viewer featuring declassified high-resolution time-series imagery

 
Canada–United States border disputes
Disputed waters
Geography of the Inuvialuit Settlement Region
Bodies of water of North Slope Borough, Alaska
Seas of the Arctic Ocean
Seas of the United States
Bodies of water of Alaska
Arctic Watershed of North America
Bodies of water of Yukon
Bodies of water of the Northwest Territories
Seas of Canada